The African Wildlife Foundation (AWF) is the leading international conservation organization focused exclusively on Africa's wildlife and wild lands.

AWF's programs and conservation strategies are designed to protect the wildlife and wild lands of Africa and ensure a more sustainable future for Africa's people. AWF protects Africa's wildlife, its wild lands, and its natural resources.

Since its inception in 1961, the organization has protected endangered species and land, promoted conservation enterprises that benefit local African communities, and trained hundreds of African nationals in conservation.

Early years

The African Wildlife Leadership Foundation (AWLF) was founded in 1961 by Russell E. Train, a wealthy judge and hunter, and member of the Washington Safari Club. Other founding members from the Safari Club were Nick Arundel, a former United States Marine Corps combat officer and journalist; Kermit Roosevelt Jr. of the CIA; James S. Bugg, a businessman; and Maurice Stans, later to become Richard Nixon's finance chairman.

Train was worried that European park managers would be replaced by unqualified Africans in conservation work as African countries gained their independence. Twenty African countries became independent in 1960 and 1961.
Train wrote "In Tanganyika alone, the government recently ordered 100 percent Africanization of the game service by 1966! ... Replacement of European staff by untrained, unqualified men spells disaster for the game".
He felt that it was urgent to train Africans to become wildlife professionals.

The first major grant of the AWLF was $47,000 to help found the College of African Wildlife Management at Mweka, Tanzania in 1963.
The college was organized by Bruce Kinloch, Chief Game Warden of Tanganyika, as a pioneer institution for the training of African wildlife managers.
Funding for Mweka was also provided by the U.S. Agency for International Development, and the Frankfurt Zoological Society, with facilities donated by the government of Tanganyika.
By 2010, the college had trained over 4,500 wildlife managers from 28 African countries and 18 non-African countries.

In 1963, AWLF started a scholarship program to bring young Africans to American universities where they could study biology and wildlife management. The AWLF built a conservation education center in the same year, situated at the entrance to the Nairobi National Park. In 1967, the AWLF provided $50,000 to finance construction of a Research Institute in Tanzania. In 1970, the AWF established a school for wildlife management in Garoua, Cameroon, giving instruction in French.
During the 1970s and 1980s, the AWLF continued to finance students, and also assisted conservation projects, often giving supplies such as tents, vehicle spare parts, water pumps, and photographic equipment rather than cash.

In 1969, the AWLF took the lead in a campaign supported by other conservation groups to protect rhinoceroses. In 1974, the foundation began a program to study cheetahs.
In 1983, the AWF dropped "Leadership" from its name. Train was disappointed with the change, believing that the organization had lost sight of its original mandate. In his view, it had become just another conservation organization, giving funding to westerners to conduct research on animals.
However, research such as Dian Fossey's work on gorillas and Cynthia Moss's work on elephants, both supported by the AWF, was clearly useful.

The foundation struggled to raise money.
In 1968, the annual budget was less than US$250,000.
In 1988, the year in which the AWF launched a campaign against elephant poaching, the foundation had a staff of six and an annual budget of just $2 million.
When the AWF turned 30 in 1991, the board of trustees continued to be dominated by prominent and wealthy Americans, many of whom served on other non-profit boards.

Recent thrusts

In more recent years, the AWF has modeled its program around three objectives: empowering people, conserving wildlife, and protecting land. Empowering people involves conservation enterprises that provide benefits and incentives to local communities, sponsoring training of African conservationists and working with government to define conservation policy.
Conserving wildlife involves research into species and how these species interact with people, the basis for creating programs from which both humans and animals can benefit.

The main thrust, however, is on protecting land, ensuring that large open landscapes are available for wildlife.
This involves supporting existing protected areas, creating private land trusts and working with local community groups on protecting special sites. Starting in 1998, land protection efforts focused on landscape-level conservation approaches. 

The foundation had income of US$19,333,998 in the fiscal year ended 30 June 2009. Of this, $8,582,555 came from public sector support, $5,815,839 from corporate and foundation support, $5,224,931 from gifts from individuals and $1,360,424 from legacy gifts.
$17,395,456 was spent on programs, $1,524,764 on fund raising, and $1,262,056 in administration.
Program funding broke down as $14,174,224 on conservation programs, $2,392,989 on public education and $828,243 on membership programs.

Priority landscapes

AWF used to call the landscapes that it supports "heartlands"; now, the organization employs a "priority landscape" approach.
Heartlands include:

Priority Landscapes
Priority Landscapes include:

Bili Uele
The Bili-Uele Protected Area Complex is found in the remote north of the Democratic Republic of the Congo, along the border of the Central African Republic. The region consists of savanna mosaic north of the Uele River and lowland primary forest to the south. Both regions support exceptional biodiversity, including forest elephants, lions, as well as the last remaining undisturbed population of the eastern chimpanzee. An estimated 35,000–65,000 eastern chimpanzees are found in this complex. However, very little is known about the Bili-Uele area, and few organizations are working there.

Congo

The Maringa-Lopori-Wamba Landscape in the Democratic Republic of the Congo one of the least developed and most remote parts of the Congo Basin.
The inhabitants are among the poorest in Africa, depending on natural resources to meet their basic needs.
Most of the people live by slash-and-burn agriculture, and rely on bushmeat such as porcupine, sitatunga, and forest hog for protein.
Cash crops include maize, cassave and groundnuts.
The growing population is placing more stress on the environment, and there is risk of a revival of logging that could harm the ability of the land to sustain the people and could jeopardize both biodiversity.

Since 1973 a Japanese team has been researching the bonobo population near the village of Wamba in 1973.
However, research was discontinued after political disorders started in 1991 followed by civil war in 1997, resuming only in the mid-2000s.
The IUCN Red List classifies bonobos as an endangered species with conservative population estimates ranging from 29,500 to 50,000 individuals.
The AWF has led efforts by local and international groups to develop a sustainable land use plan for the MLW Landscape.
The plan aims to ensure that the economic and cultural needs of the inhabitants are met while conserving the environment.
The approach combines AWF's Landscape Conservation Process and the Central African Regional Program for the Environment (CARPE) Program Monitoring Plan.
A variety of tools are used including surveys, interviews with local people and satellite image interpretation.

Etosha-Skeleton Coast
The Etosha-Skeleton Coast landscape, in the northern part of Namibia, is home to Etosha National Park and its vast salt pan, woodland, and savanna ecosystems. The landscape is home to a diverse range of wildlife, from the black-faced impala to the desert-dwelling oryx to more commonly known animals such as the elephant, wild dog, lion, and cheetah. Possibly, most importantly, to the west of the park lies the Skeleton Coast, where herds of elephants roam. African Wildlife Foundation is scaling up social venture capital investments through its subsidiary, African Wildlife Capital (AWC), which invests in socially and environmentally responsible businesses, such as the Grootberg Lodge in the Khoadi-Hoas community conservancy. These businesses must comply with conservation covenants, ensuring that they are sustainable and improving livelihoods for people and habitats for wildlife.

Faro
At the core of the Faro landscape in northern Cameroon is Faro National Park, located close to the Nigerian border. Not only does this park host the largest population of hippos in Cameroon, it is also home to elephants, black rhinos, cheetahs, hyenas, and other wildlife. AWF is lending support to counter-poaching park rangers in Faro and building a contingent of community scouts on the park's borders to provide a needed buffer between outsiders and the park.

Great Fish River
The Great Fish River Nature Reserve is located in South Africa's Eastern Cape province. The 45,000-hectare reserve, which lies in the Great Fish River valley, is home to an important and increasingly vulnerable population of critically endangered black rhino.

Kazungula

The floodplains of the Zambezi River are surrounded by a mosaic of miombo and mopane woodlands and grasslands that include important wildlife migration corridors.
The Victoria Falls, the largest in the world, are between Mosi-oa-Tunya National Park in Zambia and Victoria Falls National Park in Zimbabwe.
The Falls and surrounding area are designated a World Heritage Site.
However, the environment is threatened by growing and haphazard development of tourism, and lack of funding to the park authorities.

The AWF has established the  Sekute Conservation Area in this region in partnership with the Sekute Chiefdom, holding two elephant corridors.
AWF helped wildlife authorities settle four new white rhinos in Mosi-oa-Tunya National Park in Zambia, joining the last surviving white rhino in the country, a bull.
On 17 January 2011 it was reported that two of the female white rhinos had given birth to calves, which seemed healthy.
The area is also home to endangered black rhinos.
In 2011 a cluster of modern new buildings for the Lupani community school were opened in Kazungula, built by the AWF at a cost of US$250,000.
The new school has six classrooms, offices and five teachers' houses with three bedrooms each.

Kilimanjaro

Disney released the movie African Cats in April 2011. The Disney Worldwide Conservation Fund gave AWF a portion of the proceeds from the first week's ticket sales for use in protecting the Amboseli Wildlife Corridor. Their "See 'African Cats,' Save the Savanna" program served both to promote the movie and to raise money for conservation.

Limpopo

The Limpopo Landscape includes areas of Mozambique, South Africa and Zimbabwe.
It includes savanna, woodland, rivers and floodplains.
Fauna include sable antelope, rhinos, hippos, and many species of birds, insects and aquatic life.
The AWF has started the Leopard Conservation Science Project in this landscape .
Until recently this park had little or no infrastructure or staff to ensure that the environment was protected.
The AWF has built a conservation research center, which it is marketing to the international scientific community.
Fees from researchers will pay for staff to run the center and to manage the park.

The Great Limpopo Transfrontier Park (GLTP) is a  park that is being established to connect the Kruger National Park in South Africa, the Limpopo National Park in Mozambique, the Gonarezhou National Park in Zimbabwe and other protected areas.
It is almost the size of the Netherlands and more than three times larger than the Yellowstone National Park.
The GLTP is home to many of the species most popular with tourists, including lion, white and black rhinoceros, giraffe, elephant, hippopotamus and buffalo.
The AWF says the megapark will result in "creating new jobs and fortifying a tourism base not yet meeting its full potential".
The AWF is a major sponsor of the project that is setting up this park.

Maasai Steppe

The  Manyara Ranch Conservancy is near to Lake Manyara in Tanzania.
This is a pioneering conservation and tourism project supported by the African Wildlife Foundation, the Tanzania Land Conservation Trust and the Manyara Ranch Conservancy. While not a park, the conservancy is frequented by resident and migrating wildlife including elephant, lion, buffalo, leopard and the more common plains game. Rarely seen in the parks but a common resident on the Conservancy is the lesser kudu.

Mau Forest Complex
Within Kenya's Rift Valley, sits the Mau Forest Complex. It is the largest indigenous montane forest in East Africa and serves as a critical water catchment area for the country, providing a source of water for many of Kenya's wildlife and people. African Wildlife Foundation, together with the Kenya Forest Service, the Community Forest Association, and other stakeholders, is reforesting areas of the Mau Forest with indigenous trees.

Parc W

This  region is located around the point where Niger, Burkina Faso and Benin meet.
It consists of three national protected parks that form a UNESCO World Heritage Site, the trans-national W National Park, as well as several adjacent reserves and buffer zones.
The complex includes savanna woodlands, gallery forests and flooded plains where the Mekrou and Niver rivers meet.
It is home to large and diverse wildlife populations including the largest population of elephants in the region and the only remaining West African giraffes.
Mitochondrial and nuclear DNA research shows that this is a distinct and genetically healthy subspecies that diverged from the Rothschild's giraffe about 350,000 years ago.

In Parc W, AWF and other International NGOs such as the International Union for Conservation of Nature, World Wide Fund for Nature and Africa 70 play a central role in communication, education and organization of local communities and their leaders, and help collect socio-economic and technical data.
AWF is helping fund tree nurseries in Niger and Burkino Faso for replantings to provide fodder for the giraffes. Conservation threats are human population growth and desertification. AWF partners in the region include the Association pour la Sauvegarde des Girafes du Niger, Centre National de Gestion des Réserves de Faune (CENAGREF), Benin and the Ministries of the Environment in Burkina Faso and Niger.

Ruaha

The Ruaha area will intersect with an agriculture corridor that the Tanzanian government wants to develop in southern Tanzania. The proposed corridor will overlap many different ecosystems, possibly undermining their ecological integrity and impacting wildlife areas. AWF is scaling up social venture capital investments through its subsidiary, African Wildlife Capital (AWC), which invests in socially and environmentally responsible agricultural and other businesses—such as the Rungwe Avocado Co.—that must comply with conservation covenants to secure and maintain investment. These AWC-invested businesses not only aim to benefit wildlife, but also benefit small-farm holders.

Samburu

The national parks, private ranches, and communal lands of the Samburu Landscape support some of Africa's most impressive wildlife. The Grevy's zebra and reticulated giraffe, species that are found only north of the Equator in Africa, roam in the Samburu Landscape among the acacia grasslands. The unique conservation challenges faced in Samburu are forest/habitat degradation due to logging and farming and cattle-carnivore conflict.

AWF has implemented solutions to address these challenges, including partnering with Starbucks Coffee Trading Co. to train coffee growers in sustainable and more productive practices, providing wildlife scouts with monitoring technology, and working with Samburu warriors to protect endangered predators.

Virunga

The Virunga landscape is an area of volcanic highlands around the point where Uganda, Rwanda and the Democratic Republic of the Congo meet, Virunga is home to the last 700 mountain gorillas in the world.
It includes the Mgahinga Gorilla National Park in Uganda, where AWF opened a visitor center in July 2006.
The Virunga ecosystem is highly diverse, and also shelters chimpanzees, golden monkeys, forest elephants, and many species of birds, reptiles and amphibians.
The region is overpopulated, intensely poor and politically unstable, placing severe threats on the environment.

The AWF helped Dian Fossey study Rwandan mountain gorillas in the 1960s.
AWF President Robinson McIlvaine later said that "There would be no mountain gorillas in the Virungas today ... were it not for Dian Fossey's tireless efforts over many years".
McIlvaine initiated formation of a consortium to protect the threatened Rwandan mountain gorillas while he was president of the AWF between 1978 and 1982.
More recently, the AWF coordinated fundraising and construction of a lodge overlooking the Bwindi Impenetrable Forest National Park, home of about half the world's population of mountain gorillas.

According to Farley Mowat in his book Woman in the Mists, in the late 1970s Fossey asked McIlvaine to temporarily serve as secretary-treasurer of the Digit Fund while he was AWF President.
She had created the fund to finance patrols against poachers seeking to kill mountain gorillas. McIlvaine partnered with the International Primate Protection League, the Digit Fund, and his own AWF asking for funds, to be made out to the AWF.
The Digit Fund received none of the money. When McIlvaine suggested to Fossey that the Digit Fund could be folded into AWF, Fossey declined and McIlvaine resigned as secretary-treasurer of the fund.

The AWF is a co-sponsor of the International Gorilla Conservation Program (IGCP) in Virunga, the others being Fauna & Flora International (FFI) and the World Wide Fund for Nature (WWF). Among other activities, the IGCP works with Virunga Artisans, which markets handmade products of artisans who live near the Volcanoes, Mgahinga and Bwindi National Parks.
A census of mountain gorillas in the Virunga Massif in March and April 2010 showed that there had been a 26.3% increase in the population over the past seven years, an encouraging sign that conservation efforts were succeeding.

Save Valley

The Save Valley landscape was once dominated by a large livestock operation that pushed out native wildlife and degraded much of the ecosystem. During recent decades, cattle fences and livestock have been removed, and the landscape has seen a resurgence of wildlife and a recovery of the wild habitats.

The Save Valley Conservancy, in Zimbabwe's southern lowveld area, forms part of the Greater Limpopo Transfrontier Park. Lions, buffalo, leopard, elephant, and other game, including black and white rhinos, live in this area. AWF supports Save Valley Conservancy's anti-poaching efforts and works with government partners to ensure the protection of Save's wildlife, namely its rhino populations.

Organization

The African Wildlife Foundation headquarters are in Nairobi, Kenya with offices in South Africa, Tanzania, Uganda, Zambia and Washington, DC.
The organization is tax-exempt under section 501(c)(3) of the Internal Revenue Code.
As of 2009 there were 36 members of the Board and 132 paid staff.
Funds are raised through direct mail, grant proposals, Internet appeals, planned giving, cause-related marketing, and membership appeals.
The executive heads of the foundation have been:

The AWF is a member of International Conservation Caucus Foundation's Conservation Council.
It is also a member of EarthShare, a national federation that supports leading American environmental and conservation charities.

Notes

References

Animal charities based in the United States
Nature conservation organizations based in the United States
Environment of Kenya
Foundations based in Kenya
Environmental organizations established in 1961
International environmental organizations
Wildlife conservation organizations